Wyoming Highway 219 (WYO 219), also known as Yellowstone Road, is a  north–south state highway in central Laramie County, Wyoming, United States, that forms an eastern loop off of U.S. Route 85 (US 85).

Route description
WYO 219 runs from Central Avenue (Business Loop I-25/US 85/US 87 Business) in Cheyenne north to Torrington Road (US 85), near Interstate 25 (I-25) Exit 17 north of Cheyenne. WYO 219 runs parallel to I-25 between Exits 13 and 17, and it is the old alignment of US 85/US 87.

Yellowstone Road continues north as Laramie County Route 124 (Old Yellowstone Road) to the Platte–Laramie county line.

Major intersections

See also

 List of state highways in Wyoming
 List of highways numbered 219

References

External links

 Cheyenne @ AARoads.com
 Wyoming State Routes 200-299
 WYO 219 - US 85 to WYO 211
 WYO 219 - WYO 211 to WYO 212
 WYO 219 - WYO 212 to I-25 BUS/US 85/US 87 BUS

219
Highway 219
219
U.S. Route 85
U.S. Route 87